Godless Men is a 1920 American silent adventure drama film directed by Reginald Barker and produced and distributed by Goldwyn Pictures. It stars Russell Simpson and James "Jim" Mason as a father and son. It is based on a Saturday Evening Post short story Black Pawl by Ben Ames Williams.

This film exists in a private collection.

Cast
Russell Simpson as 'Black' Pawl
James "Jim" Mason as 'Red' Pawl
Helene Chadwick as Ruth Lytton
John Bowers as Dan Darrin
Alec B. Francis as Reverend Sam Poor
Bob Kortman as Seaman Speiss
Irene Rich as 'Black Pawl's' Wife
Lionel Belmore as Seaman Neighbor
Frankie Lee as 'Red Pawl' as a Boy (uncredited)
Guinn "Big Boy" Williams as Seaman (uncredited)

See also
Stormswept(1923)
Code of the Sea(1924)
Rugged Water (1925)
Sensation Seekers (1927)
The Perfect Storm(2000)

References

External links

allmovie/synopsis
Poster
Screen grab of beginning credits card
Film still with Helene Chadwick and Russell Simpson at silenthollywood.com

1920 films
American silent feature films
Goldwyn Pictures films
Films directed by Reginald Barker
Films based on short fiction
1920 adventure films
American adventure films
American black-and-white films
Seafaring films
1920s American films
Silent adventure films
1920s English-language films